Leonidas Sabanis (born 28 October 1971), sometimes spelled Leonidas Sampanis, is a Greek retired weightlifter, born in southern Albania, who represented Greece in 1996, 2000 and 2004 Summer Olympics. He has also been a World Champion representing Greece. He was named the 1998 Greek Male Athlete of the Year.

Early life and career
Sabanis was born Luan Shabani on 28 October 1971 in southern Albania to a Greek family.

Results representing Albania
At the European Championship in Athens, Greece, in 1989, Sabanis represented Albania as Luan Shabani and won a bronze (big) medal in the 56 kg category. He was the first to win a medal at a European Championship for Albania. A year later, at the European Championship in Aalborg (Denmark) in 1990, Sabanis won a silver (big) medal, and the first such medal for Albania.

Results representing Greece
Sabanis emigrated to Greece in 1991 and represented Greece starting from 1993. He won a silver medal in the 59 kg category at the 1996 Summer Olympics in Atlanta, United States and in the 62 kg category in the 2000 Summer Olympics in Sydney, Australia. Sabanis was originally awarded a bronze medal at the 2004 Summer Olympics in Athens, but the medal was later stripped from him as a result of a doping scandal.

References

1971 births
Albanian male weightlifters
Greek male weightlifters
Olympic weightlifters of Greece
Panathinaikos weighlifters
Weightlifters at the 1996 Summer Olympics
Weightlifters at the 2000 Summer Olympics
Weightlifters at the 2004 Summer Olympics
Olympic silver medalists for Greece
Living people
Doping cases in weightlifting
Greek sportspeople in doping cases
Sabanis
Olympic medalists in weightlifting
Competitors stripped of Summer Olympics medals
Albanian emigrants to Greece
Medalists at the 2000 Summer Olympics
Medalists at the 1996 Summer Olympics
Mediterranean Games gold medalists for Greece
Mediterranean Games silver medalists for Greece
Mediterranean Games medalists in weightlifting
Competitors at the 2001 Mediterranean Games
European Weightlifting Championships medalists
World Weightlifting Championships medalists